The interosseous muscles of the foot are muscles found near the metatarsal bones that help to control the toes. They are considered voluntary muscles.

They are generally divided into two sets:
 4 Dorsal interossei - Abduct the digits away from the 2nd digit (away from axial line) and are bipennate.
 3 Plantar interossei - Adduct the digits towards the 2nd digit (towards the axial line) and are unipennate.

The axial line goes down the middle of the 2nd digit, towards the sole of the foot (it's an imaginary line).

Both sets of muscles are innervated by the Lateral plantar nerve.

References 

Muscles of the lower limb
Foot